Čiobiškis Manor is a former residential manor on the confluence of Musė and Neris rivers, the southern part of Čiobiškis. The manor complex consists of the manor, farm labourers' building and stable. It is presently (2020) undergoing reconstruction.

History

The Radziwiłł Family 
Čiobiškis Manor was first mentioned in 1529, when the area belonged to the Radziwiłł family.

The Švikovski Family 
In the 18th century, it was owned by the Švikovski family.

They built Čiobiškis Manor, designed by Laurynas Gucevičius, in 1794 at the confluence of the Musės and Neris rivers.

The manor used to have a chapel but the landlords Švikovski built a church in a different place. At the end of the 18th century, the church burnt down.

The Piłsudski Family

Jan Chryzostom Piłsudski (c1768-1837) 
Čiobiškis Manor was then purchased by Jan Chryzostom Piłsudski (c1768-1837) in 1794.

Before selling the manor to Piłsudski, Švikovski obliged the new owner to build a new church.

Piłsudski had Čiobiškis Church built in 1810–1816. It too is thought to have been designed by Laurynas Gucevičius though that can't be proven.

After Napoleon's defeat at Waterloo, Jan's son-in-law, Antoni Chodakowski (1784-1831), a Lieutenant in Napoleon's Polish Lancer Regiment, returned to Lithuania with his wife, Marcjancella Chodakowska (née Piłsudska) (1797-d.) and two sons. The family moved into Čiobiškis with Jan Piłsudski.

When Jan died, Čiobiškis was passed down to his grandson, Stefan Aleksander Piłsudski (1823-1864).

Stefan Aleksander Piłsudski (1823-1864) 

In 1857, Čiobiškis was visited by Count Konstanty Tyszkiewicz (1806-1868), an archaeologist and ethnographer. Tyszkiewicz was performing an expedition on the river Neris, from the source to the mouth. He wrote in his book ‘Neris ir jos krantai’ (en: ‘Neris and its Banks') commenting on Čiobiškis (translated):“Čiobiškis is the landowner Piłsudski’s estate. [...] On the shores of the Neris, in the greenery of old trees and gardens, its masonry manor house was lighted by the greenhouses along the Neris shore. The chapel was bollous and graceful, although small. It has recently been built. The manor house is one of those rare and magnificent buildings, which are so rare in our country… The brave proportions and fine contours reflect the art of Gucevičius' architecture.”

Konstantin Aleksander Piłsudski (1852-1903) 
Čiobiškis was passed down to Stefan Piłsudski's son Konstantin Aleksander Piłsudski (1852-1903) and then probably to his son, Eugeniusz Antoni Piłsudski (1888-c1914).

In 1910, Čiobiškis was sold out of the Piłsudski family to Russian colonists. It had been in the Piłsudski family for 116 years or 5 generations.

Interwar Period 
In the interwar period, the manor went to the state and was turned into a children's shelter.

In 1944–1945 a partisan headquarters was established in the manor.

Soviet Period 
After World War II, it was turned into a boarding-school.  In 1965 the manor and buildings were reorganized into a special education school for children.

Lithuanian Independence Period 
In 2011 the school was closed.

Čiobiškis Manor was privately bought by Eugenija Vagnerienė and is being refurbished (2020) to be a hotel, spa and cultural centre.

References
https://www.15min.lt/naujiena/aktualu/lietuva/dvaras-ciobiskyje-500-metu-istorija-vaiku-socializacijos-centro-seselis-ir-ateities-vizijos-56-1232274

Citations 

Manor houses in Lithuania
Classicism architecture in Lithuania